Eucosma suomiana is a moth of the family Tortricidae. It is found from Sweden, through Finland and the Baltic region to northern Russia.

The wingspan is 10–17 mm.

External links
 Swedish Moths
 Fauna Europaea

Eucosmini
Moths of Europe
Moths described in 1893